Lyndsie Fogarty (born 17 April 1984 in Brisbane, Queensland) is an Australian sprint canoeist who has competed since the late 2000s. She won a bronze medal in at the 2008 Summer Olympics in Beijing in the K-4 500 m event.

References

Australian Olympic Committee profile

1984 births
Australian female canoeists
Canoeists at the 2008 Summer Olympics
Canoeists at the 2012 Summer Olympics
Living people
Olympic canoeists of Australia
Olympic bronze medalists for Australia
Olympic medalists in canoeing
Australian Institute of Sport canoeists
Medalists at the 2008 Summer Olympics
People educated at Brisbane State High School
Sportswomen from Queensland
Sportspeople from Brisbane
21st-century Australian women